The Chizbatron was an Israeli musical ensemble under the auspices of the Israel Defense Force (IDF). It operated during the 1948 Arab-Israeli War, serving within the Palmach.

History
The Chizbatron troupe was founded in January 1948. One of the founders was Haim Hefer, who served as its chief songwriter. Hefer based the band off of Red Army military bands and song and dance ensembles, favoring the role they played during Second World War. The concept applied by entertainment units in the Yishuv were also drawn. This gave him the grounds to ask for permission from Palmach commander Yigal Alon for a budget of 10 British pounds to purchase accordions for means to establish such a band. Russian-born composer Sasha Argov was appointed as the first band director. Its first performance was held on 2 February 1948 to training cadets in Dalia. The band often toured by means of a truck or a jeep, and often performed on the front line in different battle conditions. The poem Hareut was originally performed by the troupe. In the summer of 1949  the band was dismantled by order of the IDF Education and Youth Corps. The Chizbatron staged four productions during its existence, with a fifth being produced while it was a civilian theater.

See also
Music of Israel
Culture of Israel

References

1948 establishments in Israel
Chizbatron
Military units and formations established in 1948